The 2021 World Military Boxing Championship was the 58th edition of the World Military Boxing Championships. It was hosted by the CISM and BFR held in Moscow (Russia) on September 16-26, 2021. 

The championship was the first boxing competition organised by the International Military Sports Council after the COVID-19 pandemic.

The 58th championship was inaugurated by Secretary of State — Deputy Minister of Defence of Russia, who presented the greetings from the head of the Military Department, General Sergei Shoigu, the Defence Minister of Russian Federation.

The competition took place in ten weight categories for men and five for women. 228 boxers (183 men, 45 women) from 36 countries competed in the tournament with a total of 216 fights.

Medal summary

Medalists – Men

Medalists – Women

Medal table

See also
 World Military Championships

References

External links
 Official Website.
 
 
 

World Military Boxing Championship
Sports competitions in Moscow
World Military Boxing Championship
World Military Boxing Championship